An inverter compressor is a gas compressor that is operated with an inverter.

In the hermetic type, it can either be a scroll or reciprocating compressor. This type of compressor uses a drive to control the compressor motor speed to modulate cooling capacity. Capacity modulation is a way to match cooling capacity to cooling demand to application requirements.

Market needs for variable capacity

Many refrigeration and air conditioning systems require reliable processes which are more efficient, compact, environmentally friendly, and easy to install and maintain. The cooling requirements vary over a wide range during the day and over the year due to ambient conditions, occupancy and use, lighting, etc. 
In comfort cooling, there may also be the need for a stable and accurate temperature and humidity control in areas such as hospitals, IT & telecoms, process cooling. In applications such as schools, restaurants and office buildings, it is important that the cooling system is able to adapt to wide daily shifts in load. 
In process applications such as fermentation, growing tunnels and industrial processes, accurate temperature settings are required to secure production quality.

Different modulating technologies 
There are several ways to modulate the cooling capacity in refrigeration or air conditioning and heating systems. The most common in air conditioning are: on-off cycling, hot gas bypass, use or not of liquid injection, manifold configurations of multiple compressors, mechanical modulation (also called digital) and inverter technology. Each have advantages and drawbacks. 
 On-off cycling Results in switching off the fixed-speed compressor under light load conditions and could lead to short cycling and the reduction in compressor lifetime. Efficiency of the unit is reduced by pressure cycling and transient losses. The turn down capacity is 100% or 0%
 Hot gas bypass Involves injecting a quantity of gas from discharge to the suction side. The compressor will keep operating at the same speed but thanks to the bypass, the refrigerant mass flow circulating with the system is reduced and thus the cooling capacity. This naturally causes the compressor to run uselessly during the periods where the bypass is operating.  The turn down capacity varies between 0 and 100%.
 Manifold configurations Several compressors can be installed in the system to provide the peak cooling capacity. Each compressor can run or not in order to stage the cooling capacity of the unit. The turn down capacity is either 0/33/66 or 100% for a trio configuration and either 0/50 or 100% for a tandem.
 Mechanically modulated compressor This internal mechanical capacity modulation is based on periodic compression process with a control valve, the 2 scroll set move apart stopping the compression for a given time period. This method varies refrigerant flow by changing the average time of compression, but not the actual speed of the motor. Despite an excellent turndown ratio – from 10 to 100% of the cooling capacity, mechanically modulated scrolls have high energy consumption as the motor continuously runs.
 Inverter compressor Uses an external variable-frequency drive - to control the speed of the compressor. The refrigerant flow rate is changed by the change in the speed of compressor. The turn down ratio depends on the system configuration and manufacturer. It modulates from 15 or 25% up to 100% at full capacity with a single inverter from 12 to 100% with a hybrid tandem.

Working principle 

The variable-frequency drive controls the speed of compressor motor. The compressor is specifically designed to run at different motor speeds to modulate cooling output. Variable speed operation requires an appropriate compressor for full speed operation and a special compressor lubrication system. Proper oil management is a critical requirement to ensure compressor lifetime. Proper oil management provides proper lubrication for scroll set at low speed and prevents excess oil from being injected into the circuit when operating at full speed.

Applications 
Variable speed technology can be implemented in HVACR, close control and process cooling applications and as diverse as packaged or split air-conditioning units, rooftops, chillers, precision cooling, VRF and condensing units.
 Rooftop This is a very common unit type. The rising cost of energy means that air conditioning manufacturers must develop a new generation of high-efficiency, cost-effective air conditioners for commercial buildings that meet or exceed a part-load efficiency standard of typically 18 IEER. The aim is to reduce energy use by 30% over current equipment. Inverter technology helps OEMs to build units which meet this demand.
 Air handling units These have integrated cooling and are used in commercial applications for air conditioning and humidity control in diverse ranges of buildings such as small office buildings, fitness and medical centres. Inverter compressor solutions enable smooth modulation and huge energy savings.
 Modular chillers A typical modular chiller installation uses multiple fixed-speed. These units share the same water system to supply the building with cooled or heated water. Hybrid tandem, associating one inverter and one fixed-speed compressor, can better match the capacity requirement compared to a modular chiller with fixed-speed tandem compressors and increases efficiency.
 Close control units These are used in the cooling of IT and electronic equipment used in data centres, telecommunications and in manufacturing industries. Power management, energy consumption and heat loads are major challenges. Maintenance of a stable temperature and humidity control, compactness of the system and overall efficiency are key design challenges in these applications for ensuring data safety and availability. This is where inverter technology makes the difference. 
 Process cooling In many industries the machinery and processes generate a large amount of heat which requires cooling, to protect the equipment and / or to ensure that the product being manufactured is of the required quality. Inverter technology helps to secure the process while providing greater efficiency.
 Variable refrigerant flow (VRF) VRF units are very popular cooling or reversible systems (heating and cooling). They combine the flexibility for building owners and occupants alike, with energy efficiency, high comfort, and ease of installation, without compromising on reliability. VRF systems already extensively use inverter technology.

Challenges in adopting inverter scroll in HVAC systems 
The compressor and drive need to be qualified to work together and for dedicated applications. The drive modulates the compressor speed and prevents it from operating out of the compressor operating limits.  The inverter frequency drives need to use algorithms developed specifically for heating, ventilation and air conditioning (HVAC) or for refrigeration. They ensure that the system will run within the application constraints. The drive can also manage other devices such as oil injection valves or multiple compressors. As the compressor rotational speed changes, the amount of refrigerant — and oil — flowing through the compressor increases or decreases. The drive ensures that the compressor and bearings are optimally lubricated at all compressor speeds.

See also 
 Air conditioner inverter
 Scroll compressor
 Air conditioning

References

External links 
 Why and how we use capacity control
 Compressors efficiently evolve with time

Gas compressors